Vasile Valentin Năstase (born 4 October 1974) is a Romanian retired footballer who played as a defender. He is currently a manager.

Career 
In 2002, he was signed by Venezia, but owner of Venezia, Maurizio Zamparini transferred most of the team players to his new owned club U.S. Città di Palermo.

In 2004, Palermo exchanged Năstase to Bologna for Cristian Zaccardo.

After a spell with Ascoli, Năstase returned to Romania in 2007, joining Dinamo Bucharest. However, he left the club after two months, having been made the scapegoat for the club's UEFA Champions League defeat against Lazio.

In 2008, he joined the German Regionalliga Nord club Eintracht Braunschweig and on 30 June 2009 released.

International stats

Honours

Player 
Gloria Bistrița
Cupa României: 1993–94

Dinamo București
Divizia A: 1999–2000
Cupa României: 1999–2000, 2000–01

Palermo
Serie B: 2003–04

Coach 
FC Argeș 1953 Pitești
Liga IV – Argeș County: 2015–16

References

External links
 
 
 
 
 
 

1974 births
Living people
People from Argeș County
Romanian footballers
Romania international footballers
Romanian expatriate footballers
Romanian expatriate sportspeople in Italy
Romanian expatriate sportspeople in Germany
Association football defenders
ACF Gloria Bistrița players
FC Argeș Pitești players
FC Dinamo București players
Genoa C.F.C. players
Palermo F.C. players
Bologna F.C. 1909 players
Ascoli Calcio 1898 F.C. players
Eintracht Braunschweig players
Serie A players
Serie B players
Liga I players
3. Liga players
Expatriate footballers in Italy
Expatriate footballers in Germany